Milovan Minja Prelević (28 February 1970 – 1 August 2019) was a Montenegrin football coach and player.

Milovan's football career started in the FK Kom from Podgorica. Later on he played in FK Crvena Stijena, FK Budućnost, OFK Belgrade and FK Obilić. Milovan played for youth national team of Montenegro as well. He stopped with the active playing football quite early and becomes devoted to the coaching instead. His coaching job starts at FK Budućnost. He also worked at OFK Petrovac, FK Kom, FK Mladost, Montenegro U-19 national team and Hajer FC. He was coach with UEFA PRO license and lecturer at the UEFA school of coaches of Montenegro.

Playing career 

Milovan began to play football very early, at the age of 8 in the FK Kom. Quite soon he shows his rich talent, speed and football intelligence. He went through all the younger selections of Montenegro National Team, earning captain honours. Recommended by a number of goals he scored, Milovan begins to play for the younger selections FC Budućnost, the largest club in Montenegro, with which he signs his first professional contract. At the age of 19 he decides to move to OFK Belgrade. In Serbia he also played for FK Obilić.

Under a variety of circumstances Milovan decides to end his playing career at the age of 21. He then takes a break from football but returns after a call from FK Budućnost as the role of coach of youth teams.

Coaching career

2000-2009 

Year 2000 he is attending coaching school in Niš (Serbia). He starts coaching in the FK Budućnost as volunteer. He started to work independently in 2003. In the first year he won first trophy (Cadet Cup). In FK Budućnost Milovan stays until 2009. During this time he was coach of all youth selections which helped him to master the methodology of working with young players. He wins two championships and two Cups of Montenegro.

During this time in the Educational Center in Sarajevo, Bosnia and Herzegovina, Milovan receives UEFA A and UEFA PRO license. He graduated in 2010 and at that time he was one of the few Montenegrin coaches with UEFA PRO license.

2009-2010 

In the season of 2009-2010 Milovan went over to OFK Petrovac in Montenegro as an assistant and a head coach. OFK Petrovac won the Cup of Montenegro and played the third round of the Europa League (2nd-OFK Petrovac-Anorthosis 1–2, 3–1; 3rd-OFK Petrovac-Sturm 1–2, 0–5). This is the greatest achievement in the history of OFK Petrovac.

2010-2011 

2010-2011 he leads B team FK Budućnost. From this selection five players have become first team players in FK Budućnost.

2012-2014 

2012-2014 Milovan worked in OFK Mladost as an assistant and head coach. FK Mladost played the Europa League and reached the third round (1st round, FK Mladost-Videoton 1–0,1-2; 2nd FK Mladost-Senica 2-2,1-0; 3rd FK Mladost-Sevilla 1 -6, 0–3). This is the greatest achievement in the club's history.

2015-2016 

This year Milovan begins as coach of Montenegro U-19 selection, but during the summer he receives a bid from Saudi club Hajer. In the FC Hajer he has the role of assistant coach in charge, responsible for, among many other things, football analysis.

Prelević joined Omani club Al-Oruba SC in November 2015. His contract was ended shortly after due to poor results in January 2016.

2017 
On July 3, 2017, FK Otrant announced Prelević as the new manager.

2018 
In July 2018, Prelević returned to FK Kom.

2019 
On January 9, 2019, China League Two club Hangzhou Wuyue Qiantang signed Prelević.

Death
On August 1, 2019, Prelević died suddenly from a heart attack. According to the Hangzhou Wuyue Qiantang club administration's report, Prelević was absent as the team prepared their departure for a match, and was then found dead in his room.

Coaching successes 

The third round of the Europa League FK Mladost, as an assistant from 2012 to 2013

Winner Cup of Montenegro and the third round of the Europa League 2008 - 2009 - OFK Petrovac as an assistant

Titles in Championship and Cup-Montenegro in the junior categories:

 FK Budućnost - U19 Championship 2004-2005
 FK Budućnost - U17 Championship 2005-2006
 FK Budućnost - U15 Cup 2003-2004
 FK Budućnost - U14 Cup 2007-2008

References

External links
 Milovan Minja Prelevic at FK Mladost
 Milovan Minja Prelevic at Picore

1970 births
2019 deaths
Footballers from Podgorica
Association footballers not categorized by position
Yugoslav footballers
OFK Beograd players
Montenegrin football managers
OFK Petrovac managers
FK Kom managers
OFK Titograd managers
Hajer Club managers
Al-Oruba SC managers
Montenegrin expatriate football managers
Expatriate football managers in Saudi Arabia
Montenegrin expatriate sportspeople in Saudi Arabia
Expatriate football managers in Oman
Montenegrin expatriate sportspeople in Oman
Expatriate football managers in China
Montenegrin expatriate sportspeople in China